The Nordic Choir is an a cappella choir of about 73 mixed voices from Luther College in Decorah, Iowa.

In 1948, just two years after its founding by Sigvart Steen, a Luther College alumnus, a young Weston Noble began a 57-year tenure as music director and conductor. Together, Noble and The Nordic Choir cultivated the Lutheran collegiate choral traditions in the United States.

Eventually five more choirs were added to the music program to accommodate the growing interest in choral music and voice at Luther. In 2005, Luther College named Craig Arnold to the position of Director of Choral Activities and conductor of the Nordic Choir following Noble’s retirement. Arnold held the position from 2005-2010. Allen Hightower was appointed conductor Fall 2010 and led the ensemble until 2016. The current conductor is Andrew Last.
	
The Nordic Choir tours annually throughout the United States and has appeared at many of the major concert halls and music centers in the United States, including Lincoln Center, New York City; the Kennedy Center, Washington, D.C.; Orchestra Hall, Chicago; Orchestra Hall and the Historic State Theater, Minneapolis; the Ordway Music Theater, St. Paul, Minnesota; Walt Disney Concert Hall, Dorothy Chandler Pavilion and the Crystal Cathedral, Los Angeles; and the historic Mormon Tabernacle, Salt Lake City. The choir also has been featured in three international television broadcasts of The Hour of Power and on four national convention programs of the American Choral Directors Association.

Every third year the choir tours internationally. The Nordic Choir has made numerous concert tours of Europe, the Caribbean, Mexico, Russia, and Eastern Europe. During its 1994 tour of Russia and Eastern Europe, the Nordic Choir performed in Tchaikovsky Hall, Moscow, and the Franz Liszt Academy, Budapest, and shared a concert in St. Petersburg’s Philharmonic Hall with the St. Petersburg Conservatory Choir. The Nordic Choir returned to Russia and Eastern Europe in 1997 on a tour that included performances with the Moscow Chamber Orchestra. In 2000 and 2003, the choir honored the college’s roots with tours to Norway and Scandinavia. In 2006, the Nordic Choir toured Europe with concerts in Italy, Austria, Germany and the Czech Republic,including performances at St
Peter's Basilica and St. Thomas Church in Leipzig. In May and June 2009, the Nordic Choir returned to Europe with concerts in Italy, France, and Spain, and in May 2012, the choir toured the British Isles. In 2015, the choir toured Italy, and in 2018 returned to Germany to see the sites of the college's namesake Martin Luther. 
	
Closer to home, the choir appears frequently on campus in concerts, worship services and at "Christmas at Luther," the college's annual, nationally-televised and Emmy Award winning Christmas concert series, alongside the Luther College Symphony Orchestra and five other Luther choirs.
	
In the fall of 2006, the Nordic Choir released its first CD under the direction of Craig Arnold, The Road Home, that joined the extensive library of recordings highlighting the Noble choral legacy. The choir's album Prayer, under the direction of Allen Hightower, was released in 2014. Recordings of the choir are available through the Luther College Bookshop and through online platforms.

References

External links
Nordic Choir
Luther College
Luther College Recordings
Music at Luther College
Nordic Choir of Luther College at Singers.com
"Nordic Choir tours country hand in hand" at Norway.org

University choirs
Musical groups established in 1946
American choirs